Senator Marble may refer to:

Sebastian Streeter Marble (1817–1902), Maine State Senate
Vicki Marble (fl. 2010s), Colorado State Senate